Nuclear Weapons: The Road to Zero is a 1998 book edited by Joseph Rotblat, a Polish physicist and 1995 Nobel Peace Prize laureate.  The book is based on the Pugwash Conferences on Science and World Affairs, and in particular on a detailed international study published in 1993 on the importance of, and practical mechanisms to, eliminate nuclear weapons. This monograph is a series of essays that describe the many complex technical, economic, legal and political issues involved.  Contrary to the approach of nuclear powers -- that these weapons are needed for national security -- is the "no longer fanciful dream" of a nuclear-weapon-free world. Rotblat suggests that this is "a sound and practical objective, which could be realized in the foreseeable future."

The book has 344 pages.

See also
List of books about nuclear issues
Nuclear disarmament
Anti-nuclear movement

References

Nuclear history
1998 non-fiction books
Books about nuclear issues
Nuclear weapons policy